Checkley cum Wrinehill is a civil parish in Cheshire East, England. It contains three buildings that are recorded in the National Heritage List for England as designated listed buildings.  Of these, one is listed at Grade II*, the middle grade, and the other two are at Grade II. The parish is entirely rural, and the listed buildings consist of a country house, its gate piers, and a cottage.

Key

Buildings

See also
Listed buildings in Blakenhall
Listed buildings in Doddington
Listed buildings in Betley, Staffordshire
Listed buildings in Woore, Shropshire
Listed buildings in Madeley, Staffordshire

References
Citations

Sources

 

Listed buildings in the Borough of Cheshire East
Lists of listed buildings in Cheshire